Kevin Denney is the self-titled debut studio album by American country music artist Kevin Denney, released in 2002 on Lyric Street Records. It features the singles "That's Just Jessie", "Cadillac Tears" and "It'll Go Away", all of which charted on the Billboard Hot Country Singles & Tracks (now Hot Country Songs) charts between 2002 and 2003. "That's Just Jessie" was the highest-peaking of these three, reaching number 16 on the country charts and number 76 on the Billboard Hot 100. Following this song were "Cadillac Tears" and "It'll Go Away", which respectively reached numbers 30 and 43 on the country charts. Also included on this album is the song "Takin' Off the Edge", which was previously recorded by John Michael Montgomery on his 1992 debut album Life's a Dance.

After the third single from this album was released, Denney issued a fourth single entitled "A Year at a Time", which peaked at #46. This song was not included on an album, however, and Denney was dropped from Lyric Street's roster shortly afterward.

Track listing

Personnel
Compiled from liner notes.
Mike Brignardello - bass guitar
Eric Darken - percussion
Kevin Denney - lead vocals
Paul Franklin - steel guitar, Dobro
Aubrey Haynie - fiddle, mandolin
Kirk "Jelly Roll" Johnson - harmonica
Mike Johnson - steel guitar
Brent Mason - electric guitar
Steve Nathan - keyboards
Leigh Reynolds - electric guitar
Russell Terrell - background vocals
Biff Watson - acoustic guitar
Lonnie Wilson - drums

Chart performance

References

2002 debut albums
Kevin Denney albums
Lyric Street Records albums